Jody Clark (born 1 March 1981) is a British engraver formerly employed by the Royal Mint. He designed the fifth and final portrait of Queen Elizabeth II to feature on coins of the pound sterling, and that portrait was the sixth and final to feature on coins of the Australian dollar.

Career
Clark started his engraving career at the Arden Group with fellow experts Julian Homer and Christopher Nield.

Since he joined the Royal Mint in September 2012, Clark has worked on a number of projects including commemorative pieces which were given to attendees of the 2014 NATO Summit in Wales and medals struck to commemorate the 2014 Ryder Cup which took place at Gleneagles Hotel, Scotland. He has also worked on commissions for Azerbaijan, Costa Rica, Lesotho and Tanzania. In 2014 a design by Clark was featured on the Britannia coin. Prior to joining the Mint, Clark worked in commercial packaging design.

In 2015 Clark's anonymous submission to a design competition was chosen to become the fifth definitive coin portrait of Elizabeth II to feature on British coins. Clark was the first employee of the Royal Mint in over one hundred years to have designed such a portrait of the monarch. At the age of 33 when his design was chosen, Clark was younger than any of the other four designers to have created portraits of Elizabeth II for British coinage at the time their design was chosen. Uniquely, Clark's portrait of the Queen was created using computer-aided design software to turn his initial sketches into the required low-relief model, with no manual sculpting being used. Production of coins bearing Clark's design began on 2 March 2015, and they appeared in circulation later in 2015.

Personal life
Clark is originally from the Lake District in Cumbria. In early 2015 he went on paternity leave following the birth of his first child.

References

1981 births
Living people
English designers
British medallists
British currency designers
British engravers
Coin designers
People from Cumbria